Sicilienne, Op. 78, is a short work by Gabriel Fauré, composed in 1893. It was originally an orchestral piece, written for a theatrical production that was abandoned. In 1898 Fauré arranged the unperformed music as a work for cello and piano, and in the same year incorporated it into his incidental music for Maurice Maeterlinck's play, Pelléas et Mélisande, in an orchestration for theatre orchestra. It took its final form as part of a suite arranged for full orchestra by Fauré, published in 1909.

History and versions
In 1892 the manager of the Grand Théâtre, Paris, asked the composer Camille Saint-Saëns to write incidental music for a production of Molière's Le Bourgeois gentilhomme. Saint-Saëns was too busy to accept the commission, and successfully recommended his friend and former pupil Fauré. The music, which included the first version of the Sicilienne, was nearly complete when the theatre went bankrupt in 1893. The production was abandoned and the music remained unperformed.

Five years later, Fauré arranged the work for cello and piano. The Fauré scholar Jean-Michel Nectoux writes that the transcription was made for the Dutch cellist Joseph Hollman. It was published in London and Paris in April 1898, with a dedication to the English cellist W. H. Squire.

At the same time, Fauré was working on incidental music for the first English production of Maurice Maeterlinck's play, Pelléas et Mélisande, which opened in June 1898. Needing a lighthearted piece for one of the few playful scenes in the drama, he included the Sicilienne along with the new music he wrote for the production. His former pupil Charles Koechlin orchestrated the score for the theatre orchestra of 16 players.

The final form of the Sicilienne is in the four-movement Pelléas et Mélisande suite for full orchestra, arranged by Fauré and published in 1909. Nectoux notes that the final orchestration differs from Fauré's original 1893 version, written for chamber-sized theatre orchestra: in particular, the main theme is given to the oboe in the original score and to the flute in the final version in the suite.

The cello and piano and full orchestral versions of the Sicilienne have been recorded many times. There are also recordings of arrangements, not by Fauré, for bassoon and piano; cello and guitar; cello and harp; flute and guitar; flute and harp; flute and piano; guitar and orchestra; solo guitar; solo harp; oboe and piano; panpipes and piano; saxophone and orchestra; saxophone quartet; tuba and piano; viola and piano; vocal ensemble; and voice and harp.

The cello and piano version is in G minor in 6/8 time. It is marked andantino with a metronome mark of dotted crotchet = 50. The full orchestral version, also G minor, is marked allegretto molto moderato. The playing time of the piece is typically between three and a half and four minutes.

See also
 Works for cello and piano by Fauré
 Siciliana

Notes

Sources

External links
 

Chamber music by Gabriel Fauré
Instrumental duets
Incidental music
1898 compositions